Tebogo Steve Kekana (4 August 1958 – 1 July 2021) was a South African singer and songwriter. He began his musical career in the 1980s. He attended and completed his studies at UNISA.

Life and career
Kekana was born in Zebediela, Transvaal. He lost his sight at the age of five, and attended a school for the blind in Pietersburg. During his school years, he developed a love for singing, and became a member of amateur groups during the teenage years.

In 1979 and 1980, Kekana won what was then known as the SABC Black Music Award for best male vocalist. Kekana's "Raising My Family" was a big hit in Europe in 1980. In total, Kekana had recorded more than forty albums. His songs "The Bushman" and "Feel So Strong" (featuring Hotline) were hits on the Springbok Radio Chart (the semi-official South African chart of the time) reaching number 13 and number 6 in 1982 and 1983 respectively.

He worked with the likes of Ray Phiri, Nana Coyote, Joe Nina and Hotline featuring PJ Thandeka Powers.

Steve Kekana was a university graduate with B Juris and LLB degrees.  He was an Advocate and a lecturer in Labour Law at the University of South Africa.

Kekana died from COVID-19-related complications on 1 July 2021, at the age of 62.

Awards and honours

Discography

Albums

Compilations

Singles and EPs
{| class="wikitable"
|-
!Year
!Title
!Label (original issue)
|-
|1978
|Mamsy / Bolova'’ 
|His Master's Voice
|-
|1978
|Rosemary / Sweet Jane|His Master's Voice
|-
|1978
|Themba|His Master's Voice
|-
|1979
|Nomsa Ntombi Yami|His Master's Voice
|-
|1979
|Aka Zenzanga (U Mary) / Uqhoka Amasudi|His Master's Voice
|}

 Biography 
 By Sydney Fetsie Maluleke (2019); Foreword by Max Mojapelo Steve Kekana: The I In Me'', Protea Book House

References

External links 
 The melody of freedom | South African History Online
 Steve Kekana to receive SAMA24 lifetime achievement award

 
 Disabled government official becomes a joint winner of South African Music Awards (SAMA) | South African Government
 #SAMA 24 to honour Spokes H, Steve Kekana, Mbongeni Ngema
 Steve Kekana
 Steve Kekana on Apple Music
 Steve Kekana
 Steve Kekana performing at the 702 Concert in the Park in 1985
 Galaxy of Stars: Steve Kekana with Mafikizolo
 Putting Popular Music in Its Place
 swedishcharts.com - Hotline with P. J. Powers and Steve Kekana - Feel So Strong
 swedishcharts.com - Swedish Charts Portal
 Steve Kekana - I Shall Be Released
 Advocate Steve Kekana Takes Over the Reins at JHB Society for the Blind

1958 births
2021 deaths
People from Lepelle-Nkumpi Local Municipality
Northern Sotho people
21st-century South African male singers
Blind musicians
20th-century South African male singers
Deaths from the COVID-19 pandemic in South Africa